The John Hinkson House in Harrison County, Kentucky near Shawhan, dates from c.1790.  It was listed on the National Register of Historic Places in 1983.

The house is a three-bay two-story dry stone house hall-parlor plan house.  It was built by John Hickson, a Revolutionary War soldier and famous early settler, who led the first group of white men up the Licking River to settle in this area.

The listing included four contributing buildings and a contributing structure.  It has also been known as the Old Ammerman Place.

References

National Register of Historic Places in Harrison County, Kentucky
Federal architecture in Kentucky
Houses completed in 1790
Houses in Harrison County, Kentucky
Houses on the National Register of Historic Places in Kentucky
1790 establishments in Virginia
Hall-parlor plan architecture in the United States